Ssanin is a 1924 Austrian-Polish silent film directed by Friedrich Feher and Boris Nevolin and starring Magda Sonja, Inez Allegri and Oscar Beregi Sr. It is based on the novel Sanin by Mikhail Petrovich Artzybashev.

Cast
 Magda Sonja as Lydia Ssanina, Wladimir's sister  
 Inez Allegri as Karssavina  
 Oscar Beregi Sr. as Wladimir Petrowitsch Ssanin  
 Babette Devrient as Mutter Ssanins  
 Hans Moser as Diener bei Ssanin  
 Józef Węgrzyn as Viktor Sergejewitsch Sarudin  
 Reinhold Häussermann as Diener bei Sarudin  
 Richard Edon as Dr. Nowikow  
 Günther Hadank as Jurij Swaretschitsch  
 Richard Duschinsky as Semjenow 
 Viktor Franz as Sselowejtschik  
 Robert Valberg as Malinowsky  
 Nikolaus von Lovrie as Tanarew  
 Hans Marr as Pjetr Iljitsch  
 Karl Forest as Betrunkenener  
 Fritz Strassny 
 Frau. Newolina 
 Boris Nevolin 
 Gustav Diessl 
 Viktoria Pohl-Meiser

See also
Lyda Ssanin (1923)

References

Bibliography
 Otto Boele. Erotic nihilism in late imperial Russia the case of Mikhail Artsybashev's Sanin.. University of Wisconsin Press, 2009

External links

1924 films
Austrian silent feature films
Polish silent feature films
Films directed by Friedrich Feher
Films based on Russian novels
Films set in Russia
Austrian black-and-white films
Polish black-and-white films